"Caravan of Love" is a 1985 R&B hit originally recorded by Isley-Jasper-Isley, the second half of the Isley Brothers' 3 + 3 lineup of the 1970s.

Original Isley-Jasper-Isley version
After breaking away from the family group, the group (notably Chris Jasper) wrote and produced this single, which was Jasper's interpolation intending to reach audiences by presenting Christian beliefs in his music. The song became the trio's biggest hit going to number 1 on the Billboard R&B singles chart and number 51 on the Billboard pop chart in 1985; it would be their only prominent hit before they splintered into solo careers in 1988. The music video was filmed on-location in New York City.

Personnel
Chris Jasper: Keyboards, lead vocals, piano, production
Ernie Isley: Guitar, backing vocals, production
Marvin Isley: Bass, backing vocals, production

Track listings

7" vinyl single
Side one
 "Caravan of Love" – 4:15
Side two
 "I Can't Get over Losin' You" – 4:05

12" vinyl single
Side one
 "Caravan of Love" – 5:43
Side two
 "I Can't Get over Losin' You" – 4:05

Chart performance

The Housemartins version 

British indie band the Housemartins released "Caravan of Love" in November 1986. The a cappella song was a success, reaching number one on the UK Singles Chart on 16 December 1986 (only the second a cappella recording to do so, after "Only You" by the Flying Pickets in 1983), before being denied the Christmas number one single by a posthumous re-release of Jackie Wilson's "Reet Petite". The song was included on the Housemartins' greatest hits compilation Now That's What I Call Quite Good.

Track listings
7-inch vinyl single

Side one
 "Caravan of Love" – 3:40
Side two
 "When I First Met Jesus" – 2:46

12-inch vinyl single

Side one
 "Caravan of Love"
 "We Shall Not Be Moved"
Side two
 "When I First Met Jesus"
 "So Much in Love"
 "Heaven Help Us All (Sermonette)"

Weekly charts

Year-end charts

Other versions 

On the Rippingtons 1996 album, Brave New World, featuring the vocals of the Whispers.
Jazz artist Terry Callier on his 2002 album, Speak Your Peace.
In 2003, Australian born Irish singer Johnny Logan recorded the song on his album, We All Need Love.
In 2004, German pop group Preluders covered the song on their album, Prelude to History.
British pop singer Pixie Lott released in November 2014 a charity version of the song, as the lead single from her first hits collection, Platinum Pixie: Hits. The song charted at number 129 on the UK Singles Chart.

References

1985 songs
1985 singles
1986 singles
1987 singles
The Housemartins songs
A cappella songs
Number-one singles in Sweden
UK Singles Chart number-one singles
The Isley Brothers songs
Songs written by Chris Jasper
Songs written by Ernie Isley
Songs written by Marvin Isley
Epic Records singles
Go! Discs singles
Elektra Records singles